Kėdainiai Free Economic Zone is a special economic zone located in Kėdainiai, Lithuania. It has 130.55 ha area, which was established in 2012 for 49 years.

FEZ companies 

The industrial and medical gas company AGA investing 20M EUR into oxygen and nitrogen gas factory which will serve a growing demand in the Baltic region market. It will be built by Linde Engineering. The factory expected to launch in 2020.   In 2018 Natūralus Pluoštas UAB launched a hemp stalks processing plant. The factory is producing textile hemp fiber.

Tax incentives

References

External links 
 

Free economic zones of Lithuania
Economy of Kėdainiai
2012 establishments in Lithuania